Qian'an County is a county in the northwest of Jilin province, China.

Administrative divisions
There are six towns and four townships under the county's administration.

Climate

References

External links

County-level divisions of Jilin